Oakamoor railway station is a closed railway station in the Churnet Valley, Staffordshire.  The station was opened in 1849 as part of the Churnet Valley Line constructed by the North Staffordshire Railway.  Serving the village of Oakamoor the station remained open until 1965 when all services were withdrawn,   A little north of the station, freight traffic from Oakamoor Sand Sidings continued until 1988.

From 1917 until 1963 shunting in these sidings was performed by a battery-electric locomotive, built on a wagon chassis. This has now been preserved at the National Railway Museum.

Preservation
The track remains in situ as far as the sand sidings and is now owned by the Churnet Valley Railway (CVR).  It is not yet in regular use, but on 21 September 2008, the first service for 20 years ran to Oakamoor with a CVR shareholders' special.

The railway trackbed that extends down the Churnet Valley to the former station at Alton has been converted to a footpath.

The CVR hopes to one day reach Oakamoor station as part of a project in bringing the CVR into becoming the largest preserved railway network within the centre of England.

Notes

External links
 Oakamoor station on navigable 1948 O. S. map

Disused railway stations in Staffordshire
Former North Staffordshire Railway stations
Beeching closures in England
Railway stations in Great Britain opened in 1849
Railway stations in Great Britain closed in 1965
1849 establishments in England
1965 disestablishments in England